Chrysopa incompleta is a species of green lacewing in the family Chrysopidae. It is found in North America.

References

Further reading

 

Chrysopidae
Articles created by Qbugbot
Insects described in 1911
Taxa named by Nathan Banks